Paragus pecchiolii is a species of hoverfly.

Description
This species shows a black thorax with two dusty stripes and a scutellum with yellow apex. Abdominal tergites are black, with distinct silvery hairy stripes, often reddish along lateral margins. Legs are yellow.

Distribution
This species is present in most of Europe, in the Near East and in North Africa.

References

External links
  Nature Photography
 Syrphidae.com

Diptera of Europe
Syrphinae
Insects described in 1857
Taxa named by Camillo Rondani